Elisabeth "Sissy" Theurer (born 20 September 1956) is an equestrian from Austria, now known as Elisabeth Max-Theurer after marriage.

Biography
She began horse riding at age 10. In 1968 she met Hans Max, a riding instructor, in cooperation with whom she achieved her main results and whom she married fifteen years later. In 1973 she received Mon Cherie, a gray horse, as a bonus while buying another one. Mon Cherie's first steps were rather disappointing, but after consequent and persistent work he became very skillful, famous for his piaffe-passage tour and pirouettes.{fact}

At the 1979 European Dressage Championships in Aarhus Theurer with Mon Cherie won the gold medal. A year later on Mon Cherie she became an Olympic champion.

Various international successes followed. On another horse, Acapulco, she participated at the 1984 Summer Olympics and came in 11th. After breaks for the birth of her daughter Victoria (in 1985) and son Johannes (in 1987), Theurer returned to competition and participated in the 1992 Summer Olympics, where she competed on the horse Liechtenstein, finishing 8th.

After finishing her career in 1994, Theurer now supports her daughter Victoria, who is also an Olympic equestrian. Theurer has also been the President of the Austrian Association for Riding and Carriage Driving since 2002.

Theurer is also a shareholder in the Plasser & Theurer company which manufactures rail track laying and maintenance machines.

Elisabeth Max-Theurer became a FEI 5* (Olympic) Judge in 2018.

References

External links
 
 A story of Elisabeth, Hans and Mon Cherie on the website of Victoria Max-Theurer

Austrian female equestrians
Equestrians at the 1980 Summer Olympics
Equestrians at the 1984 Summer Olympics
Equestrians at the 1992 Summer Olympics
Olympic equestrians of Austria
Olympic gold medalists for Austria
Austrian dressage riders
1956 births
Living people
Sportspeople from Linz
Olympic medalists in equestrian
Medalists at the 1980 Summer Olympics
Recipients of the Decoration of Honour for Services to the Republic of Austria